Benton & Bowles (B&B) was a New York-based advertising agency founded by William Benton and Chester Bowles in 1929. One of the oldest agencies in the United States, and frequently one of the 10 largest, it merged with D'Arcy-MacManus Masius in 1985, and continued business until a reorganization in 2002.

History
The agency's success was closely related to the rise in popularity of radio. Benton & Bowles invented the radio soap opera to promote their clients' products, and by 1936 were responsible for three of the four most popular radio programs on the air.

In 1956, B&B and their client Procter & Gamble launched the nationally televised soap opera As the World Turns on CBS.

B&B created some of the most memorable commercials on television, including "Look, Ma, No Cavities" for Crest toothpaste and "When E.F. Hutton Talks, People Listen" for the New York brokerage house.

In 1981, they set up Telecom Entertainment as a subsidiary to handle production, which would handle $12–15 million per year, in order to develop television movies and miniseries, as well as pay cable television shows, most notably book adaptations, and it will be handled by Michael Lepiner, who will serve as president of the Telecom Entertainment unit of the advertising agency.

The company's subsidiary Telecom Entertainment decided to go solo in order to distribute products domestically and internationally by 1987, in order to let Telecom to expand their development slate for the 1987–88 season, and it would have sixteen hours of telefilms in order to up with domestic distribution withheld, in order to becoming more active in seeking co-productions in the international TV marketplace, and looking into direct distribution of its product.

Later that year, the Telecom Entertainment unit had inked a pact with Yorkshire Television, the ITV franchisee, to co-produce and develop product for the global marketplace, and the Telecom/Yorkshire pact would involve co-productions involving international creative artists, stars and British crew and technical production expertise, and it would acquire the rights to four M.M. Kaye novels for his Death In book series, as well as The Attic: The Hiding of Anne Frank, for CBS and ITV.

Benton & Bowles merged with D'Arcy-MacManus Masius (D-MM) in 1985 to form D'Arcy Masius Benton & Bowles (DMB&B). The agency later merged with Leo Burnett Worldwide to form BCOM3, which was subsequently bought by Publicis Group in 2002. A subsequent reorganization by Publicis marked the end of the Benton & Bowles brand.

Alumni
Russ Alben, ad executive 
Victor G. Bloede, former CEO who helped introduce the slogan Good to the last drop for Maxwell House coffee. Mr. Bloede was hired as a copywriter in 1950 and rose quickly, becoming a vice president in 1955 and regularly receiving promotions before being named president and chief executive in 1968. He was the first and only creative executive to run Benton. His promotion came as several agencies were considering moving creative talent, rather than businessmen, into management.
Irwin Gotlieb, Global CEO of GroupM
Nina Lawrence, publisher of W magazine worked here.
Shepherd Mead joined B&B in 1936 as a mail-room clerk. He had worked his way up to a vice-presidency by the time he left in 1956 to pursue a full-time writing career. His most famous book, How to Succeed in Business Without Really Trying, published in 1952, satirizes his corporate experiences at the agency. Written in his spare time — before work and on weekends — the book was a best-seller, and in 1961 it was adapted into a hit Broadway musical, with songs by Frank Loesser and a libretto by Abe Burrows, which in turn became a movie in 1967.
Howard Stern worked as an assistant media planner for Benton & Bowles in 1976 before launching his successful radio career.
Dick Wolf, American television producer best known as creator and executive producer of both the Law & Order and the Chicago franchise, worked as an advertising copywriter for Benton & Bowles early in his career.

References

Advertising agencies of the United States
Marketing companies established in 1929
Companies based in New York City
1929 establishments in New York (state)